Avelino Borromeo Lim Jr. (born April 1, 1962), better known as Samboy "The Skywalker" Lim, is a retired Filipino professional basketball player of the Philippine Basketball Association and many-time national player in the 1980s and 90s.

As a high-flying wing, he distinguished himself with his flamboyant and often dangerous forays to the basket, punctuated by acrobatic shots, hang-time moves, or slam dunks. A five-time All-Star and two-time PBA Mythical Team selection, he did not however win a Most Valuable Player Award because he did not get to complete a full season due to the many injuries he sustained on the court.

Career
A 15-year old Lim was discovered while playing on the courts of Phil-Am Life Homes in Quezon City by former basketball player, Jun Celis. This subsequently led to athletic scholarships, which were helpful given that his father, Dr. Avelino B. Lim Sr., died due to coronary thrombosis just as the younger Lim was entering high school.

Amateur career
After high school in San Beda, Samboy spent a year's residence at Letran before finally seeing action in the NCAA in 1982. Even as a first-year varsity player, Samboy was already a vital cog of Letran’s championship team. He would have won the NCAA Most Valuable Player award if not for his teammate, Jerry Gonzales, late season push and heroics in Letran's last two games which won for the latter the coveted plum. In 1983, Lim was again frustrated in his bid for an MVP award as another teammate, Romeo Ang, edged him out  as Most Valuable Player. Samboy was all set to join the NCC squad of coach Ron Jacobs even before the start of the 1984 NCAA tournament but he begged for a grace period so he could play in the collegiate league. Samboy finally won the NCAA MVP trophy as he led the Knights to a grand slam, their third straight NCAA seniors’ championships from 1982 to 1984,  under coach Larry Albano.

Lim has been a consistent national team member. His first stint with the nationals was during the 1983 SEA Games in Singapore, where the Philippines retained the title. In 1984, he was a mainstay of the RP Youth team and the RP quintet in the Asian Interclub. He readily marched off to the Ron Jacobs camp the following year and as a rookie of the Northern Consolidated squad, the guest amateur quintet in the PBA, he has dislodged several stars from their starting position and is always among the first five players off the bench. Samboy won championships with the nationals in the Jones Cup, SEA Games, and the ABC crown in early 1986. After the NCC core disbanded, he was selected as part of the Philippine national team that competed in the 1986 Asian Games. He was one of the main players and top scorers of the national team that went on to win the bronze medal.

Samboy's first commercial team was the Lhuillier Jewelers in the PABL First Conference in 1986. He spearheaded the ballclub to a title, together with Jojo Lastimosa and Al Solis.

Professional career

In September 1986, the cream of amateur cagers, including former national players, were seeking their release from the BAP to turn pro and join the comeback San Miguel team (To be known as Magnolia Cheese) in the PBA Third Conference. Samboy, along with Elmer Reyes, were released upon their return from the Asian Games.

In the 1986 PBA draft, he was the 1st overall pick in Round 1. Lim was selected by the San Miguel Beermen, the only PBA Team he played for in his entire 11-year professional career. He made his pro debut on October 7, 1986, as Magnolia scored their first win against Alaska after three straight losses.

Lim was injury-prone for the next two seasons (1987–88). Although he led the San Miguel Beermen to the 1988 Third Conference. Their outstanding hang time earned him the monicker "Skywalker" and previous injuries have not stopped him from playing with reckless abandon and he still comes up with acrobatic and unbelievable shots.

Sat out 11 games early in the 1989 Open Conference, Samboy missed "only" 18 games the whole season, the year San Miguel Beermen won the Grandslam and Lim was the team's third-leading scorer with 15.2 ppg (13th-best in the league that season).

He finally had an injury-free season in 1990. This resulted in his emerging as San Miguel's leading scorer. Lim scored 42 points in the 2nd PBA All-Star Game and was named Most Valuable Player. He was hands down choice as a member of the RP Team in the Asian Games in Beijing, China, and was selected in the Asian Games Mythical five. Samboy could have made it to the Mythical five in the PBA for the first time had his team fared better in the Third Conference. Nevertheless, the dragon, as he is often called besides the skywalker, settled for the Mythical Ten.

In 1993, he was awarded with the first ever sportsmanship award for his exemplary behavior on the court. Lim is also a member of the Mythical Second Team Selection twice (1990 and 1993). His remarkable play was a joy to watch and he was a constant fan favorite because of his aerial maneuvers. However, also because of those seemingly inhuman skills, Lim suffered numerous serious injuries that limited his PBA career to just nine seasons. Despite the fact that he never won an MVP award, Lim was considered by fans as the "Real MVP."

Throughout his career, he sported jersey no. 9 and wore knee-high socks, his testament and tribute to his idol Julius "Dr. J" Erving even though he stood only five feet eleven inches tall.

Later career and retirement

Lim retired from the professional league in 1997. In 1998, he joined the Philippine Basketball League to play for the Welcoat House Paints in a guest appearance, and he retired that year becoming its team manager. In 2000, he was named into the PBA's 25 Greatest Players. In his entire PBA career, he played for only one team, San Miguel Beer, he later served as San Miguel team manager. In 2006, he assumed the team manager post of SMB's sister team Barangay Ginebra Kings.

In 2005, PBA fans had another chance to see him put his intensity and high-wire forays back on the court as he suited up for the PBA Greats Team. The PBA Greatest Game was held in the Araneta Coliseum as thousands of fans watched their favorite legends and great players of all time play. Lim scored 29 points in that game.

On October 6, 2016, the PBA renamed the Sportsmanship Award in his honor as he was the first recipient of the feat. It is given to a PBA player who most “exemplifies the ideals of Sportsmanship on the court - ethical behavior, fair play, and integrity”.

Personal life
Samboy Lim was married to Darlene Marie Berberabe, the former CEO of Home Development Mutual Fund otherwise known as the PAG-IBIG Fund, and also a UP Professorial Lecturer. Berberabe and Lim have since separated. Their only child, Jamie Christine Berberabe Lim, is a 2019 SEA Games Gold Medalist, Summa Cum Laude graduate, and Valedictorian, (BS Mathematics) College of Science, University of the Philippines.

Health
Lim's health had been an issue during his playing days, with the numerous injuries he suffered as a result of his stunts on the court. After his retirement from active play, he kept himself fit by lifting weights, jogging, and playing basketball.  He has also set up a basketball clinic for children. In the early part of 2005, Samboy Lim started conducting basketball training classes and summer camps. His training regimen and modules focused on ball handling, dribbling, passing, shooting, lay-ups, and defense. In 2010, the Samboy Lim Player Development Academy was created. Enrollment was highly successful especially for the summer basketball camps. Unfortunately, the program was discontinued when he suffered a heart attack in November 2014.  

On the evening of November 28, 2014, he was rushed to a hospital unconscious after collapsing just minutes after coming out of a PBA Legends exhibition game  at the Ynares Center in Pasig. According to fellow PBA great Nelson Asaytono, Lim was doing some stretching on the sideline shortly after being pulled out of the game by Legends coach Bogs Adornado when he collapsed. He slipped into a coma and was first admitted to the Intensive Care Unit of the Medical City before he was later transferred to the intermediate care unit. On January 14, 2015, he slipped out of his comatose state and was brought home where he will continue to receive treatment and therapy.

Samboy's story became instrumental in the passage of the Samboy Lim Law. Republic Act 10871, or “The Basic Life Support Training in Schools Act”. The Bill authored by Rep./Coach Yeng Guiao in 2015, was filed in honor of Samboy. The law provides for basic life support training or CPR in high school in public and private schools.

To this day, years after that medical emergency, Samboy continues to receive round the clock 24 hour medical care and is attended to by a team of medical specialists/doctors, physical therapists, and private nurses.

Career PBA highlights
Member, PBA's 25 Greatest Players
Member, 1989 San Miguel Grand Slam Team
2-time Mythical Second Team Selection (1990 and 1993)
First ever recipient of the Sportsmanship Award (1993)
5-time PBA All-Star (1989, 1990, 1992, 1993, 1996)
1990 PBA All-Star Game MVP (Scored 42 points) All-Star Team
PBA's 25 Greatest Player Award
PBA's 40 Greatest Player Award
PBA Hall of Fame Award, Class 2009
9 Time Member - PBA Champion San Miguel Beermen 
These championships are: 1987 PBA Reinforced Conference, 1988 PBA Open Conference, 1988 PBA Reinforced Conference, 1989 PBA Open Conference, 1989 PBA All-Filipino Conference, 1989 PBA Reinforced Conference, 1992 PBA All-Filipino Conference, 1993 PBA Governors’ Cup, 1994 All-Filipino Cup
No. 9 retired by the San Miguel Beermen

Other highlights
MVP, 1982 ASEAN School Youth Championship 
NCAA GRAND SLAM Team, 1982, 1983, and 1984, (Letran Knights)
Most Valuable Player Award, 1983 Guam International Basketball Tournament (Letran Knights)
NCAA MVP 1984 (Letran Knights) 
1990 Asian Games Mythical Five, also known as XI ASIAD or 11th Asian Games held in Beijing, China 
Member, 1990 Asian Games (Silver Medal)
Member, 1986 Asian Games (Bronze Medal)
Member, Mythical Five (1990 Asian Games)

Winning Championships:
NCAA Seniors Grandslam Team Letran, 1982, 1983, and 1984
1983 Southeast Asian (SEA) Games Champion, which was held in Singapore
1984 Brunei Invitational Basketball Tournament Champion (Letran Knights)
1984 FIBA Asian Club Basketball Cup Champion NCC/San Miguel Philippines
1985 Southeast Asian (SEA) Games Champion NCC/San Miguel Philippines, which was held in Thailand
1985 PBA Reinforced Conference Champion (Amateur Guest Team) NCC
1985 William Jones Cup International Basketball Champion NCC/San Miguel Philippines
1985 ABC Champion NCC, also known as FIBA Asia Cup Tournament in Malaysia
FIBA Asia Champion NCC/San Miguel Philippines, 1986
PABL Champions Lhulliers Jewellers Team, 1986
PBA Grandslam Team San Miguel Beer, 1989 Open Conference, 1989 All-Filipino Conference, 1989 Reinforced Conference
PBA All-Filipino Champion San Miguel Beer, 1992
PBA Governor's Cup Champion San Miguel Beer, 1993
PBA All-Filipino Cup Champion San Miguel Beer, 1994

References

External links
https://web.archive.org/web/20130703145655/http://samboylim.net/
Samboy Lim Player Profile

1962 births
Living people
Asian Games bronze medalists for the Philippines
Asian Games medalists in basketball
Asian Games silver medalists for the Philippines
Basketball players at the 1986 Asian Games
Basketball players at the 1990 Asian Games
Medalists at the 1986 Asian Games
Medalists at the 1990 Asian Games
Letran Knights basketball players
Philippine Basketball Association All-Stars
Philippine Basketball Association players with retired numbers
Philippines men's national basketball team players
Filipino men's basketball players
San Miguel Beermen players
Shooting guards
Small forwards
Basketball players from Manila